Gary Wayne Holt (born May 4, 1964) is an American musician from the San Francisco Bay Area. He is a guitarist, bandleader, and main songwriter for thrash metal band Exodus and was a member of Slayer from 2011 to 2019, replacing Jeff Hanneman on a temporary basis due to an illness in 2011, and on a permanent basis after Hanneman's death in May 2013.

Career

Exodus

After guitarist Tim Agnello left Exodus in 1981, Holt joined the band and has been the main songwriter and the most senior member of the group ever since. Following Kirk Hammett's 1983 departure from Exodus to join Metallica, Holt kept the band going and for many years, he and Rick Hunolt were referred to as the Exodus' "H-Team" guitar players. Holt is the only member of Exodus who has played on every album.

Slayer

On February 12, 2011, it was announced that Holt would be temporarily filling in for Jeff Hanneman in the band Slayer. Holt also played with Slayer for the Big 4 Concert in Indio, California on April 23, 2011, as well as Fun Fun Fun Fest in Austin, Texas on November 6, 2011. Holt was later confirmed to be a permanent member of Slayer, following Hanneman's death on May 2, 2013, and stayed with the band until their split, following the conclusion of their 2018–2019 farewell tour. He also recorded guitar tracks on Slayer's 2015 album Repentless, but did not have any writing contributions on the album, except for guitar solos.

Other work
In October 2008, Holt released an instructional guitar video called "A Lesson in Guitar Violence". He also produced Warbringer's second album, Waking into Nightmares. In 2019 he was included on "Cheapside Sloggers", a song on Volbeat's Rewind, Replay, Rebound.

Equipment
Holt endorses ESP Guitars as of September 2014 and has a signature version of the Eclipse model, ending his relationship with Schecter Guitar Research, where he previously had various signature models. He has also used Ibanez, B.C. Rich, Jackson Guitars, Bernie Rico Jr., and Yamaha guitars.

For amplification, he currently uses a Marshall Silver Jubilee in Slayer and an ENGL Savage 120 in Exodus as well as a Kemper Profiling amp. In the past, he has used a modified Marshall JCM800, Mesa Boogie Mark III, Marshall JVM, Peavey Triple XXX, and ENGL Savage 120. Before using the Silver Jubilee, DSL100H and Marshall JVM amps with Slayer, Holt made use of Jeff Hanneman's touring rack.

Musical influences

Holt's main guitar influences are Ritchie Blackmore, Michael Schenker, Angus Young, Tony Iommi, Uli Jon Roth, Matthias Jabs and Ted Nugent. His favorite bands include Venom, Motörhead, Black Sabbath, early Iron Maiden and Judas Priest.

Personal life
Outside of music, Holt enjoys foreign and period films.

According to Holt, the track "War Is My Shepherd" on the album Tempo of the Damned is a treatise of America's "pro-God" and "pro-war" stance and how he feels the two beliefs are incompatible with each other.

Holt endorsed Barack Obama in the 2008 presidential election, stating, "I used to have a lot of respect for McCain, but he realized after the dirty defeat that he suffered at the hands of George W. Bush in the South Carolina primary in the (2000) election that he can only get elected if he plays the Karl Rove tactic b.s. He's doing it. It's just one debunked lie after the other. He's the kind of guy who will tell you the sky is red, you look up and it's blue, and he won't admit he's wrong. He's playing dirty politics. Palin is just terrifying, the thought of this lady being a heart attack away from having the nuclear codes. She's crazy and she's dumb."

In the 2004 election, Holt vouched for John Kerry, but conceded that "they're all dirty crooks, all politicians. But at least (Kerry) wasn't a coward. He fought in Vietnam whereas George W. Bush Jr. was a draft dodger."

In 2017, he referred to President Donald Trump as a "serial liar" and an "embarrassment to this country, this world, and everyone living in it."

Holt is an atheist. In October 2017, he became a vegan.

On December 17, 2018, his father Billie Charles Holt (born July 6, 1933) died.

On March 18, 2020, Holt began exhibiting symptoms of COVID-19. By March 31, 2020, he had tested positive for the virus, although by then he had already recovered.

Discography
Exodus
 1982 1982 Demo
 1985 Bonded by Blood
 1987 Pleasures of the Flesh
 1989 Fabulous Disaster
 1990 Impact Is Imminent
 1991 Good Friendly Violent Fun
 1992 Lessons in Violence
 1992 Force of Habit
 1997 Another Lesson in Violence
 2004 Tempo of the Damned
 2005 Shovel Headed Kill Machine
 2007 The Atrocity Exhibition... Exhibit A
 2008 Let There Be Blood
 2008 Shovel Headed Tour Machine: Live at Wacken & Other Assorted Atrocities
 2010 Exhibit B: The Human Condition 2014 Blood In, Blood Out 2021 Persona Non GrataSlayer
2015 – Repentless2019 - The Repentless KillogyAsylum
 1990	Asylum (Demo)Destruction
 2008	D.E.V.O.L.U.T.I.O.N.Heathen
 2009	The Evolution of ChaosHypocrisy
 2005	VirusLaughing Dead
 1990	Demo 1990 (Demo)Metal Allegiance
 2015– Metal Allegiance [Gift of Pain]

Panic
 1991	EpidemicUnder
 1998	Under (EP)Warbringer
 2009 Waking into NightmaresWitchery
 2010	Witchkrieg''

References

External links

 Metal Express interview

1964 births
American atheists
American heavy metal guitarists
American male guitarists
California Democrats
Exodus (American band) members
Guitarists from California
Living people
Musicians from Richmond, California
Slayer members
20th-century American guitarists